James Leslie Toohey Jr. (1 June 1915 – 10 February 2004) was an Australian rules footballer who played with Fitzroy in the Victorian Football League (VFL).

Toohey, a Sandhurst recruit, started out in the Fitzroy seconds in 1934. He began his league career in 1935, when he played seven senior games, which was bettered by 14 appearances in 1938.

In 1937, Toohey joined Western Australian National Football League club Perth. His father, former Fitzroy player Jim Toohey Sr., was a member of the Perth Football Club committee. He had to wait until mid-season to make his debut, in order to fulfill the three-month residential qualification required to get an interstate permit at that time.

Toohey returned to Fitzroy after just one season in Perth and made 14 league appearances in the 1938 VFL season.

He was cleared to Camberwell in 1939.

Toohey's younger brother, Jack, played with Fitzroy for six seasons, from 1947 to 1952.

References

External links

1915 births
Australian rules footballers from Melbourne
Fitzroy Football Club players
Perth Football Club players
Sandhurst Football Club players
Camberwell Football Club players
2004 deaths
People from Carlton, Victoria